Avondale and Stonehouse is one of the 20 electoral wards of South Lanarkshire Council. Created in 2007, the ward initially elected four councillors using the single transferable vote electoral system before a boundary review in 2017 reduced the number of councillors to three. It covers an area with a population of 17,749 people.

The ward has produced strong results for both Labour and the Scottish National Party (SNP). Prior to the boundary review, the SNP held half the seats in the ward and both parties have returned at least one member at every election.

Boundaries
The ward was created following the Fourth Statutory Reviews of Electoral Arrangements ahead of the 2007 Scottish local elections. As a result of the Local Governance (Scotland) Act 2004, local elections in Scotland would use the single transferable vote electoral system from 2007 onwards so Avondale and Stonehouse was formed from an amalgamation of several previous first-past-the-post wards. It contained the majority of the former Lindsay ward and part of the former Larkhall South ward as well as all of the former Avondale North and Avondale South wards. Avondale and Stonehouse is located in the west of South Lanarkshire and covers a rural hinterland next to its boundaries with East Ayrshire and East Renfrewshire. The ward centres around the towns of Strathaven and Stonehouse as well the villages of Chapelton and Glassford. Following the Fifth Statutory Reviews of Electoral Arrangements ahead of the 2017 Scottish local elections, the ward's boundaries were altered to remove a corridor of farmland between the White Cart Water and southern East Kilbride. The review resulted in a reduction in the number of seats from four to three in order to balance with other wards with similar populations.

Councillors

Election results

2022 election

2017 election

2012 election

2007 election

Notes

References

Wards of South Lanarkshire
Strathaven
Stonehouse, South Lanarkshire